Italic script, also known as chancery cursive and Italic hand, is a semi-cursive, slightly sloped style of handwriting and calligraphy that was developed during the Renaissance in Italy. It is one of the most popular styles used in contemporary Western calligraphy.

History

Italic script is based largely on Humanist minuscule, which itself draws on Carolingian minuscule. The capital letters are the same as the Humanist capitals, modeled on Roman square capitals. The Italian scholar Niccolò de' Niccoli was dissatisfied with the lowercase forms of Humanist minuscule, finding it too slow to write. In response, he created the Italic script, which incorporates features and techniques characteristic of a quickly written hand: oblique forms, fewer strokes per character, and the joining of letters. Perhaps the most significant change to any single character was to the form of the a, which he simplified from the two-story form to the one-story form ⟨ɑ⟩ now common to most handwriting styles.

Under the influence of Italic movable type used with printing presses, the style of handwritten Italic script moved toward disjoined, more mannered characters. By the 1550s the Italic script had become so laborious that it fell out of use with scribes.

The style became increasingly influenced by the development of Copperplate writing styles in the eighteenth century. The style of Italic script used today is often heavily influenced by developments made as late as the early 20th century. In the past few decades, the italic script has been promoted in English-speaking countries as an easier-to-learn alternative to traditional styles of cursive handwriting.

In the UK this revival was due in part to the 19th century artist William Morris. In 1905 Monica Bridges book , A New Handwriting for Teachers was published.  She was a skilled calligrapher and this book is creditted with making italic handwriting fashionable in British schools.

Edward Johnston's book Writing & Illumination & Lettering was published in 1906, Alfred Fairbank's book A Handwriting Manual in 1932 and the Dryad Writing Cards in 1935. These Dryad cards were used for teaching young school children to write an italic hand.

Italics script is considered one of the best examples of Latin cursive writing and had a great influence on the calligraphic styles that followed throughout Europe. It was developed at a time when the spread of printing technology had already decreed the fall into disuse of manuscript books, consequently shifting the calligraphic attention from the books to the production of single papers and documents, for which handwriting remained an irreplaceable tool. For these needs, it was necessary to write faster than how humanistic script originally allowed, yet just as elegantly, hence the birth of the Italic script with a thinner and slightly inclined style that made it adaptable to more rapid execution. This period also gave birth to the first treatises on calligraphy: among them stands out "La Operina" by Ludovico Vicentino degli Arrighi.

A modern version called Getty-Dubay was introduced in 1976.

See also

Asemic writing
Bastarda
Blackletter
Book hand
Calligraphy
Chancery hand
Court hand (also known as common law hand, Anglicana, cursiva antiquior, or charter hand)
Cursive
Hand (writing style)
Handwriting
History of writing
Law hand
Palaeography
Penmanship
Ronde script (calligraphy)
Rotunda (script)
Round hand
Secretary hand

References

Further reading

External links
Latin-alphabet handwriting at Encyclopædia Britannica

Latin-script calligraphy
Typography
Penmanship
Western calligraphy